Miloš Marić (Serbian Cyrillic: Милош Марић; born 5 March 1982) is a Serbian football midfielder.

Career
He was released by Olympiacos in summer 2007. He rejoined to his former coach Trond Sollied at K.A.A. Gent. On 9 January 2010, VfL Bochum signed Marić until June 2013. After one year with VfL Bochum, he announced his return to Belgium and signed for Lierse S.K. on 16 December 2010. 
He joined his third Belgian Pro League club during the 2012–13 summer transfer window by signing for K.S.C. Lokeren.

Career statistics

Honours
Olympiacos
Greek Championship: 2005, 2006, 2007
Greek Cup: 2005, 2006
Gent
Belgian Cup: 2010

References

External links
 Player profile on Serbian National Team page
 
 

1982 births
Living people
Serbian footballers
Olympiacos F.C. players
Association football midfielders
Serbia and Montenegro international footballers
Serbia and Montenegro under-21 international footballers
Sportspeople from Užice
FK Sloboda Užice players
FK Remont Čačak players
FK Zeta players
K.A.A. Gent players
VfL Bochum players
Lierse S.K. players
K.S.C. Lokeren Oost-Vlaanderen players
S.K. Beveren players
Super League Greece players
Belgian Pro League players
Bundesliga players
2. Bundesliga players
Serbian expatriate footballers
Expatriate footballers in Belgium
Expatriate footballers in Greece
Expatriate footballers in Germany
Serbia and Montenegro expatriate footballers
Serbia and Montenegro footballers
Serbia and Montenegro expatriate sportspeople in Greece
Serbian expatriate sportspeople in Belgium
Serbian expatriate sportspeople in Greece
Serbian expatriate sportspeople in Germany